Vito Cruz station can refer to two rail stations in the Manila metropolitan area:

 Vito Cruz station (LRT), a station on the Manila Light Rail Transit
 Vito Cruz station (PNR), a station on the Philippine National Railway